The Hoffman Bridge is a covered bridge near Crabtree in Linn County in the U.S. state of Oregon.  It was added to the National Register of Historic Places as Crabtree Creek – Hoffman Covered Bridge in 1987.

Hungry Hill Drive crosses the  bridge.

Constructed in 1936, the bridge was named after its builder, Lee Hoffman. The creek and the nearby community were named after John Crabtree, who settled there in 1845.

See also
 List of bridges on the National Register of Historic Places in Oregon
 List of Oregon covered bridges

References

External links

Bridges completed in 1936
Covered bridges on the National Register of Historic Places in Oregon
Bridges in Linn County, Oregon
Wooden bridges in Oregon
Tourist attractions in Linn County, Oregon
National Register of Historic Places in Linn County, Oregon
Road bridges on the National Register of Historic Places in Oregon
Howe truss bridges in the United States